"Taba Naba" is a children's song originating in the Torres Strait Islands just north of the continent of Australia.  This song is usually accompanied by a "sit-down dance" where the "dancers" perform traditional movements corresponding to the lyrics.

The song is a traditional song in Meriam Mir, a language of the Torres Strait Islanders.

Lyrics

Taba naba naba norem,
Tugei penaisir mi, dinghy em nabatre, 
Mi ko keimi serer em nebewem,
Taba naba norem.
Translation:
Come on let's go to the reef
Get into the dinghy when the morning tide is low
Let us row to the edge of the reef
Come on let's go to the reef

Popular culture
Children’s band The Wiggles performed it with Australian pop singer and Eastern Torres Strait native Christine Anu on their 2000 album It's a Wiggly Wiggly World. On the related video Anu  performed the sit-down dance to the song. The song would soon be featured again in two TV series (Lights, Camera, Action, Wiggles! and Ready, Steady, Wiggle!), Wiggle Town and Duets (with Christine Anu returning).

In Brazil, the Brazilian singer Xuxa recorded the song for her album Xuxa Só Para Baixinhos 4 (English: Xuxa only for kids 4)

See also
 Torres Strait Islands
 The Wiggles

References
 "Taba Naba" page

External links
 Photo of children performing the "sit-down dance"

Children's songs
Songs about beaches
Torres Strait Islands culture